The Llama M82 is a pistol produced by the Spanish firm Llama-Gabilondo y Cía. S.A. It is a standard-issue pistol of the Spanish Armed Forces. Mechanically, it is not dissimilar to the Beretta 92, utilising a short-recoil and falling-block locking mechanism.

Gallery

References

External links
 Variants and specifications (Spanish).

Semi-automatic pistols of Spain
9mm Parabellum semi-automatic pistols
.40 S&W semi-automatic pistols